Microderes is a genus of beetles in the family Carabidae, containing the following species:

 Microderes akbensis Jedlicka, 1958
 Microderes brachypus (Steven, 1809)
 Microderes breviformis (Tschitscherine, 1898)
 Microderes diversopunctatus (Solsky, 1874)
 Microderes intermittens (Solsky, 1874)
 Microderes namanganensis (Heyden, 1885)
 Microderes nanulus (Tschitscherine, 1898)
 Microderes subtilis (Tschitscherine, 1898)
 Microderes taschketensis (Jedlicka, 1958)
 Microderes undulatus (Gebler, 1841)

References

Harpalinae